The International Council for Information Technology in Government Administration (ICA) is a non-profit making organisation which promotes the information exchange of knowledge, ideas and experiences between central government information technology authorities.

The ICA was established in 1968.

References

External links
http://www.ica-it.org/

Information technology organizations
Organizations established in 1968